Egri can refer to following:

 Agriș, a commune in Romania
 Lajos Egri (1888-1967), a literary analyst and teacher